Richard Fritz Behrendt (6 February 1908 in Gliwice, Upper Silesia – 17 October 1972 in Basel) was a German sociologist.

1908 births
1972 deaths
German sociologists
People from Gliwice
People from the Province of Silesia
University of Cologne alumni
Academic staff of the Free University of Berlin
German male writers